Chabbé is a deep gorge in Sidamo Province, Ethiopia,  south of Addis Ababa, whose walls contain about 50 relief carvings that appear to depict female  cattle. It is possible that the gorge was at one time a cave or tunnel.

References

External links 
 World Archives of Rock Art - W00282.bmp

Archaeological sites in Ethiopia
Rock art in Africa
Archaeological sites of Eastern Africa